Kalamia is a municipal department of the city of Kozani in northern Greece. Located north-west of the city centre, it had a population of 180 at the 2011 census.

References

Kozani
Populated places in Kozani (regional unit)